Lorey may refer to:

Locations
 Lorey, a commune in the Meurthe-et-Moselle department in north-eastern France
 Le Lorey, a commune in the Manche department in Normandy in north-western France

Surnames
 Albert Lorey Groll (1866–1952), American artist
 Dean Lorey (born 1967), American writer
 Isabell Lorey, European political theorist
 Maurice DeLorey (born 1927), Canadian politician